Pequannock Township is a township in Morris County, in the U.S. state of New Jersey. As of the 2020 United States census, the township's population was 15,571, an increase of 31 (+.2%) from the 2010 census count of 15,540, which in turn reflected an increase of 1,652 (+11.9%) from the 13,888 counted in the 2000 census. The primary community in the township is the census-designated place of Pompton Plains.

The name "Pequannock", as used in the name of the township and of the Pequannock River, is thought to have been derived from the Lenni Lenape Native American word Paquettahhnuake, meaning "cleared land ready or being readied for cultivation". The name "Pompton" has been cited by some sources to mean "a place where they catch soft fish".

New Jersey Monthly ranked Pequannock Township as the "Best Bang for the Buck" in New Jersey and 9th overall in its 2011 edition of "Best Places to Live" in New Jersey.  It was then ranked 14th overall in the 2013 edition of "Best Places to Live". In the 2015 edition of "Best Places to Live" in New Jersey, Pequannock ranked 4th overall.

History
The name for the area goes back at least as far as March 1, 1720, when it was referred to as "Poquanick", a precinct in Hunterdon County. Formed as "Poquanock Township" on March 25, 1740, as the county's largest township, what is now a  bedroom community composed of Pompton Plains in its northern portion and old Pequannock in its southern was once a vast  region of rural farmland settled by the Dutch after its purchase by Arent Schuyler and associates in 1695 and 1696. The township was incorporated by the New Jersey Legislature's Township Act of 1798 as one of New Jersey's initial group of 104 townships on February 21, 1798.

Over time, several municipalities were split off from the township: Jefferson Township on February 11, 1804; Rockaway Township on April 8, 1844; Boonton Township on April 11, 1867; Montville Township on April 11, 1867; Butler Borough on March 13, 1901; Kinnelon Borough on March 21, 1922; Lincoln Park Borough on April 25, 1922; and Riverdale Borough on April 17, 1923.

During the American Revolutionary War, both Comte de Rochambeau and George Washington's troops camped on what is now the site of the Pequannock Valley Middle School. While Washington stayed at the Schuyler-Colfax House in nearby Pompton, unproven oral history states that he attended church services in the First Reformed Church located in Pompton Plains, also known as the Pompton Meeting House, which had been constructed in 1771. The Mandeville Inn, located on the site of where the soldiers had camped during the war, was built in 1788 and was once owned by Garret Hobart, later Vice President of the United States. The stone with the engraved date is now located inside the Pequannock Valley Middle School when the Inn was demolished and replaced with the school in 1950.

During the Civil War, Pequannock was a stop on the Underground Railroad.  The Giles Mandeville House (also built in 1788), a field and quarry-stone structure located at 515 Newark-Pompton Turnpike, which is believed to have served as a waypoint for many runaway slaves, still stands today, and has been in use as the Manse of the adjacent First Reformed Church since 1953.

Historic sites
Historic sites located in Pequannock Township include:

 Ackerson Mead Clark House, a Greek revival mansion constructed in the 1870s.
 Bank Barn
 Giles Mandeville House
 Mandeville Inn
 Martin Berry House, a Dutch home constructed in 1720, making it Pequannock's second-oldest.
 Paul DeBow House
 Paul Barney DeBow House
 Pequannoc Spillway
 Pompton dam, constructed in 1837 to provide water for the Morris Canal.
 Pompton Plains Railroad Station was built in 1872 and offered regular passenger train service until 1966. Added to the National Register of Historic Places on March 5, 2008, the station serves as the Pequannock Township Museum.

Geography
According to the United States Census Bureau, the township had a total area of 7.11 square miles (18.41 km2), including 6.79 square miles (17.58 km2) of land and 0.32 square miles (0.83 km2) of water (4.53%).

Interstate 287 crosses the northwest corner of the township, with a full interchange just north of the township in the borough of Riverdale.

Unincorporated communities, localities and place names located partially or completely within the township include Pequannock and Pompton Plains, each of which is served by a separate post office of the United States Postal Service.

Pequannock Township borders the municipalities of Kinnelon, Lincoln Park and Riverdale in Morris County; and Pompton Lakes and Wayne in Passaic County.

Demographics
{{US Census population
| 1810=  3853 | 1810n=*
| 1820=  3820
| 1830=  4355
| 1840=  5190
| 1850=  4126 | 1850n=*
| 1860=  5438
| 1870=  1534 | 1870n=*
| 1880=  2239
| 1890=  2862
| 1900=  3250
| 1910=  1921 | 1910n=*
| 1920=  2291
| 1930=  2104 | 1930n=*
| 1940=  2856
| 1950=  5254
| 1960= 10553
| 1970= 14350
| 1980= 13776
| 1990= 12844
| 2000= 13888
| 2010= 15540
| 2020= 15571
| estimate=15552
| estyear=2021
| estref=
| footnote=Population sources:<small>1800–1920 18401850–1870<ref>Raum, John O. [https://books.google.com/books?id=5qZ4AAAAMAAJ&pg=PA256 The History of New Jersey: From Its Earliest Settlement to the Present Time, Volume 1], p. 256, J. E. Potter and company, 1877. Accessed December 20, 2012. "Pequannock, named for the tribe of Indians found there, contained in 1850, 4,126 residents; in 1860, 5,438; and in 1870, 1,534."</ref> 18501870 1880–18901890–1910 1910–19301930–1990 20002010 2020Total Population: Census 2010 - Census 2020 New Jersey Municipalities, New Jersey Department of Labor and Workforce Development. Accessed December 1, 2022.* = Lost territory in previous decade.</small>
}}

2010 census

The Census Bureau's 2006–2010 American Community Survey showed that (in 2010 inflation-adjusted dollars) median household income was $84,322 (with a margin of error of +/− $4,784) and the median family income was $109,572 (+/− $9,602). Males had a median income of $77,988 (+/− $7,857) versus $50,744 (+/− $7,369) for females. The per capita income for the township was $42,016 (+/− $2,741). About 1.8% of families and 3.1% of the population were below the poverty line, including 4.7% of those under age 18 and 4.3% of those age 65 or over.

2000 census
As of the 2000 United States census there were 13,888 people, 5,026 households, and 3,829 families residing in the township.  The population density was 1,965.1 people per square mile (758.4/km2).  There were 5,097 housing units at an average density of 721.2 per square mile (278.4/km2).  The racial makeup of the township was 96.60% White, 0.30% African American, 0.12% Native American, 1.91% Asian, 0.50% from other races, and 0.58% from two or more races. Hispanic or Latino of any race were 2.94% of the population.DP-1: Profile of General Demographic Characteristics: 2000 - Census 2000 Summary File 1 (SF 1) 100-Percent Data for Pequannock township, Morris County, New Jersey , United States Census Bureau. Accessed July 12, 2012.

There were 5,026 households, out of which 35.6% had children under the age of 18 living with them, 65.5% were married couples living together, 7.8% had a female householder with no husband present, and 23.8% were non-families. 20.9% of all households were made up of individuals, and 8.8% had someone living alone who was 65 years of age or older.  The average household size was 2.76 and the average family size was 3.23.

In the township the population was spread out, with 25.9% under the age of 18, 5.8% from 18 to 24, 29.6% from 25 to 44, 24.6% from 45 to 64, and 14.1% who were 65 years of age or older.  The median age was 39 years. For every 100 females, there were 92.9 males.  For every 100 females age 18 and over, there were 90.5 males.

The median income for a household in the township was $72,729, and the median income for a family was $84,487. Males had a median income of $61,093 versus $38,523 for females. The per capita income for the township was $31,892.  About 2.5% of families and 3.0% of the population were below the poverty line, including 3.4% of those under age 18 and 4.8% of those age 65 or over.

Government

 Local government 
Since January 1, 1956, the Township has operated within the Faulkner Act, formally known as the Optional Municipal Charter Law, under the Council-Manager Plan E form of local government. The township is one of 42 municipalities (of the 564) statewide that use this form of government. The Council is comprised of five members elected at-large in a partisan vote to four-year terms in office on a staggered basis, with either two or three seats coming up for election in even-numbered years as part of the November general election. At an annual reorganization meeting, the members of the Council select one of their members to serve as Mayor and another as Deputy Mayor, each serving a one-year term.Township Council Reorganization Meeting Minutes of January 3, 2017, Pequannock Township. Accessed May 11, 2017. "The Clerk requested nominations from the Council on the selection of a member to serve as Mayor for the year 2017...." The Township Council hires a Township Manager, who serves as the chief executive and administrative officer of the Township.About Pequannock Township, Pequannock Township, backed up by the Internet Archive as of October 26, 2006. Accessed March 3, 2008.

, Pequannock's Township Council consists of Mayor Melissa Florance-Lynch (R, term on council and as mayor ends December 31, 2022), Deputy Mayor David G. Kohle (R, term on council ends 2024; term as deputy mayor ends 2022), John Driesse (R, 2022; elected to serve an unexpired term), Ryan Herd (R, 2024) and Kyle Russell (R, 2022).2022 Municipal Data Sheet, Pequannock Township. Accessed July 17, 2022.Morris County Municipal Elected Officials For The Year 2022, Morris County, New Jersey Clerk, updated March 3, 2022. Accessed May 1, 2022.General Election 2020 November 3, 2020 Summary Report Official Results, Morris County, New Jersey, updated November 20, 2020. Accessed January 1, 2021.

In July 2021, the Township Council appointed John Driesse to fill the seat expiring in December 2022 that had been held by Richard Phelan until he resigned from office the previous month.

Ed Engelbart was named Township Historian, following a resolution passed on May 10, 2011, making him the first person to be named to this position in a decade.

Federal, state and county representation
Pequannock Township is located in the 11th Congressional District and is part of New Jersey's 40th state legislative district.2019 New Jersey Citizen's Guide to Government, New Jersey League of Women Voters. Accessed October 30, 2019. Prior to the 2011 reapportionment following the 2010 Census, Pequannock Township had been in the 26th state legislative district.

 

Morris County is governed by a Board of County Commissioners comprised of seven members who are elected at-large in partisan elections to three-year terms on a staggered basis, with either one or three seats up for election each year as part of the November general election. Actual day-to-day operation of departments is supervised by County Administrator, John Bonanni. , Morris County's Commissioners are
Commissioner Director Tayfun Selen (R, Chatham Township, term as commissioner ends December 31, 2023; term as director ends 2022),
Commissioner Deputy Director John Krickus (R, Washington Township, term as commissioner ends 2024; term as deputy director ends 2022),
Douglas Cabana (R, Boonton Township, 2022), 
Kathryn A. DeFillippo (R, Roxbury, 2022),
Thomas J. Mastrangelo (R, Montville, 2022),
Stephen H. Shaw (R, Mountain Lakes, 2024) and
Deborah Smith (R, Denville, 2024).
The county's constitutional officers are the County Clerk and County Surrogate (both elected for five-year terms of office) and the County Sheriff (elected for a three-year term). , they are 
County Clerk Ann F. Grossi (R, Parsippany–Troy Hills, 2023),Clerks, Constitutional Officers Association of New Jersey. Accessed June 1, 2022.
Sheriff James M. Gannon (R, Boonton Township, 2022)Sheriffs, Constitutional Officers Association of New Jersey. Accessed June 1, 2022. and
Surrogate Heather Darling (R, Roxbury, 2024).Surrogates, Constitutional Officers Association of New Jersey. Accessed June 1, 2022.

Politics
As of March 2011, there were a total of 10,911 registered voters in Pequannock Township, of which 4,042 (37.0%) were registered as Republicans, 2,242 (20.5%) were registered as Democrats,  and 4,625 (42.4%) were registered as Unaffiliated. There were 2 voters registered as Libertarians or Greens.

In the 2012 presidential election, Republican Mitt Romney received 58.8% of the vote (4,850 cast), ahead of Democrat Barack Obama with 40.3% (3,326 votes), and other candidates with 0.9% (76 votes), among the 8,309 ballots cast by the township's 11,383 registered voters (57 ballots were spoiled), for a turnout of 73.0%. In the 2008 presidential election, Republican John McCain received 58.8% of the vote (5,341 cast), ahead of Democrat Barack Obama with 39.7% (3,608 votes) and other candidates with 0.9% (84 votes), among the 9,088 ballots cast by the township's 11,236 registered voters, for a turnout of 80.9%. In the 2004 presidential election, Republican George W. Bush received 62.0% of the vote (4,889 ballots cast), outpolling Democrat John Kerry with 37.1% (2,925 votes) and other candidates with 0.4% (45 votes), among the 7,886 ballots cast by the township's 10,055 registered voters, for a turnout percentage of 78.4.

In the 2013 gubernatorial election, Republican Chris Christie received 68.6% of the vote (3,695 cast), ahead of Democrat Barbara Buono with 29.9% (1,612 votes), and other candidates with 1.5% (82 votes), among the 5,436 ballots cast by the township's 11,301 registered voters (47 ballots were spoiled), for a turnout of 48.1%. In the 2009 gubernatorial election, Republican Chris Christie received 58.5% of the vote (3,550 ballots cast), ahead of Democrat Jon Corzine with 33.1% (2,008 votes), Independent Chris Daggett with 6.9% (420 votes) and other candidates with 0.8% (49 votes), among the 6,073 ballots cast by the township's 11,127 registered voters, yielding a 54.6% turnout.

Education
The Pequannock Township School District serves public school students in pre-kindergarten through twelfth grade. As of the 2018–19 school year, the district, comprised of five schools, had an enrollment of 2,123 students and 167.5 classroom teachers (on an FTE basis), for a student–teacher ratio of 12.7:1. Schools in the district (with 2018–19 enrollment data from the National Center for Education Statistics) are 
Stephen J. Gerace Elementary School 290 with students in grades K–5, 
Hillview Elementary School 313 with students in grades K–5, 
North Boulevard Elementary School 340 with students in grades K–5, 
Pequannock Valley School with 459 students in grades 6–8 and 
Pequannock Township High School with 701 students in grades 9–12.

Holy Spirit School is a Catholic school serving pre-kindergarten through eighth grade operated under the auspices of the Roman Catholic Diocese of Paterson.Morris County, Roman Catholic Diocese of Paterson Catholic Schools Office. Accessed February 22, 2023. In addition, there is Kolbe Immaculata School, a non-diocesan Catholic school for grades 1–8; the Netherlands Reformed Christian School (PreK–12); and Chancellor Academy, a school founded in 1983 that serves students in sixth through twelfth grades who have not succeeded in a traditional school structure.

Transportation

Roads and highways

Public transportation
The Mountain View and Lincoln Park NJ Transit stations are both near Pequannock, offering service on the Montclair-Boonton Line to Hoboken Terminal. Pequannock Township was formerly served by the Pompton Plains railroad station, which has been added to the National Register of Historic Places.

Bus service is provided by NJ Transit on the 194 line to the Port Authority Bus Terminal in Midtown Manhattan.Morris County System Map, NJ Transit. Accessed August 3, 2015. In September 2012, as part of budget cuts, NJ Transit suspended service to Newark on the 75 line.

Media
Pequannock is served by New York City TV stations. It is served by the newspapers The Star-Ledger, the Daily Record, and The Record of Bergen County.

Notable people

People who were born in, residents of, or otherwise closely associated with Pequannock Township include:
 Don Argott (born 1972), documentary filmmaker and musician
 Jason Biggs (born 1978), actor who has appeared in the American Pie films
 Michael T. Cahill, Dean of Brooklyn Law School
 Peter Cameron (born 1959), novelist and short-story writer.
 Derek Jeter (born 1974), former shortstop for the New York Yankees.
 Danny Kass (born 1982), Olympic snowboarder
 Sibyl Kempson (born 1973), playwright and performer
 Shawn Keough (born 1959), member of the Idaho Senate
 Davana Medina (born 1974), figure competitor
 Susan Misner (born 1971), actress who has appeared on films and television, including roles in One Life to Live, The Bronx Is Burning, Rescue Me and Chicago French Montana (born 1984), rapper
 Criss Oliva (1963–1993), musician who was the lead guitarist and co-founder of Savatage
 Dan Prestup (born 1984), drummer
 Danielle Rose Russell (born 1999), actress who has appeared in films and on television, including roles in The Originals, Legacies and Wonder''
 Pete Yorn (born 1974), singer-songwriter and musician
 Karen Young (born 1958), actress

References

External links

Pequannock Township Official Website
Pequannock Township School District

School Data for the Pequannock Township School District, National Center for Education Statistics
Pequannock Skatepark Association
Pequannock Lacrosse Club
Revolutionary Petition of Patriots (May 1776)
Pequannock Democratic Club
Pequannock Historical Society

 
1740 establishments in New Jersey
Faulkner Act (council–manager)
Populated places established in 1740
Populated places on the Underground Railroad
Townships in Morris County, New Jersey